This is a list of horror films that were released in 2022. This list includes films that are classified as horror as well as other subgenres.

References

External links
 Horror films of 2022 on Internet Movie Database

2022
2022-related lists
horror